The Provost of St John's, Beverley (Beverley Minster) is a position said to have been created by Archbishop Thomas of Bayeux (1070–1100). The provost had responsibility for the administration of the lands owned by the minster and for the general revenues of the chapter.  He was an external officer with authority in the government of the church, but with no stall in the choir and no vote in chapter.

Most of the provosts of Beverley were appointed as a reward for their work as civil servants. The post was finally terminated during the Reformation.

List of Provosts
Source:Durham University e-theses  except when otherwise stated.
 1092–1109: Thomas (afterwards Archbishop of York, 1109–1114)
 1109-: Robert 
 c.1132: Thomas (Normannus)
 c.1135: Robert
 c.1141–1152: Thurstan 
 c.1153–1154: Roger de Pont L'Évêque
 1154–1162: Thomas Becket (afterwards Archbishop of Canterbury, 1162–1170)
 by 1169–1177: Geoffrey 
 1181–1201: Robert
 by 1202–1204: Simon of Wells (afterwards Bishop of Chichester, 1204–1207)
 1205: Alan
 by 1212–1217: Morgan {Bishop-elect of Durham, 1215)
 1217–1218: William
 1218–1222: Peter de Sherburn
 1222–c.1239: Fulk Basset (afterwards Dean of York, 1238 and Bishop of London, 1244–1259)
 1239–1246: William de York (afterwards Bishop of Salisbury, 1246–1256)
 1247–1264: John Maunsell
 1265–1274: John Chishull (afterwards Bishop of London, 1274–1280}
 c.1274–1278 Geoffrey de Sancto Marco
 1278–1294: Peter de Cestria (Peter of Chester)
 1294–1304: Aymo de Carto {afterwards Bishop of Geneva, 1304)
 1304–1306: Robert de Abberwick
 1306–1308: Walter Reynolds (afterwards Bishop of Worcester, 1308)
 1308–1317: William Melton (afterwards Archbishop of York, 1317–1340)
 1317–1338: Nicholas de Huggate
 1338–1360: William de la Mare
 1360-c.1368: Richard de Ravenser
 c.1368–c.1373: Adam de Lymbergh
 1373–1379: John de Thoresby
 1381–1419: Robert Manfield 
 1419–1422: William Kinwolmarsh
 1422–1427: Robert Neville (Bishop of Salisbury, 1427–1438) and Bishop of Durham, 1437–1457)
 1427–1450: Robert Rolleston 
 1450–1457: John de Barningham
 1457–1457: Lawrence Booth (afterwards Bishop of Durham, 1457–1476}
 1457–1465: John Booth (afterwards Bishop of Exeter, 1465}
 1465–1465: Henry Webber
 1465–1467: Peter de Tastar
 1467–1493: William Poteman
 1493–1503: Hugh Trotter
 1503–1525: Thomas Dalby
 1525–1543: Thomas Wynter (also Dean of Wells, 1525-1529 and Archdeacon of Cornwall, 1537)
 1543–c.1548: Reginald Lee

References

Lists of Anglicans
Lists of English people